Ha Noi 1 Women's Football Club is a Vietnam women's football club, based in Hà Nội, Vietnam. The team is playing in the Vietnam women's football championship.

History 
The club has a rich history in Vietnam Women's football.

Honours

Domestic competitions

League
 Vietnam women's football championship
  Winners (10): 1998, 1999, 2000, 2001, 2003, 2008, 2009, 2011, 2013, 2014

Current squad
:

Head coaching history 
Head coaches by years (2010–present)

References

External links
 

Women's football in Vietnam